Mount Vision is a hamlet (and census-designated place) in Otsego County, New York, United States. According to the 2010 U.S. Census, Mount Vision had a population of 1,018. Mount Vision has a post office with ZIP code 13810. Mount Vision was formerly known as Jacksonville. A tuberculosis sanatorium  was located here in the early 20th century.

References

Hamlets in Otsego County, New York
Hamlets in New York (state)